Logan Creek is a stream in Colusa County, California. It remains in the Sacramento National Wildlife Refuge Complex for much of its 3-mile run.

References

Rivers of Colusa County, California
Rivers of Glenn County, California
Tributaries of the Sacramento River
Geography of the Sacramento Valley